Journeys is a specialty chain retailer, owned by Genesco, of branded fashion footwear and accessories with approximately 1,200 stores nationwide. Journeys operates five retail concepts across North America including Journeys, Journeys Kidz, Shi by Journeys, Underground by Journeys and Little Burgundy. Journeys is focused on "quickly shifting fashion footwear trends.", and is described as the anti-Foot Locker.

History
Journeys opened its first store in Nashville, Tennessee at Rivergate Mall in December 1986. Within ten years, Journeys had opened 100 stores, and by 1999 launched its website. In 2001, Journeys Kidz opened its first location, followed by an opening of Shï in 2005. In 2010, Journeys opened its first store in Canada.

In 2011, Journeys started the "Attitude That Cares" program to encourage its employees to get involved locally in community outreach & service. In 2014, Journeys began its partnership with the Vans Warped Tour, becoming its Presenting Sponsor for its 20th Anniversary tour. In 2015, Journeys became the title sponsor of the Alternative Press Music Awards. In 2021, Journeys announced a partnership with Can’dAid, (candaid.org), an organization that rallies volunteers from all walks of life to build thriving communities.

In 2018, Journeys partnered with Converse to put on a free prom for teens in Houston, Texas.

Brands

Journeys
Journeys is a teen specialty footwear retailer. The first location opened at the Rivergate Mall in Nashville, Tennessee in 1986, and there now are stores in every state and $1 billion in sales.

Journeys Kidz
Journeys Kidz is a specialty footwear brand that opened its first store in 2001 for kids 5–12 years old, with the tagline “Big Kidz Shoes, Little Kidz Sizes.” There are 170 locations in the United States.

Little Burgundy
Little Burgundy was purchased from Aldo Group in 2015, adding 37 retail stores. The brand is focused on students and young professionals.

References

External links
 Journeys Canada site
 Little Burgundy brand site

Shoe brands
Shoe companies of the United States
American companies established in 1986
Retail companies established in 1986
Footwear retailers of the United States
Companies based in Nashville, Tennessee
1986 establishments in Tennessee